Kevin McKenzie may refer to:

Kevin McKenzie (cricketer) (born 1948), South African right-hand batsman
Kevin McKenzie (dancer) (born 1954), American ballet performer, choreographer and artistic director
Kevin McKenzie (rugby union) (born 1968), Scottish international rugby union player
Kevin McKenzie (American football) (born 1975), American football player

See also
Kelvin MacKenzie (born 1946), editor/media figure, United Kingdom
Mackenzie (surname)